Angela Pearly-Gates Montenegro-Hodgins (born Pookie Noodlin Pearly-Gates Gibbons) is a fictional character in the television series Bones (2005–2017), portrayed by Michaela Conlin. She is a classically trained artist who creates forensic reconstructions for the police.

Brief character history
Angela Montenegro is the daughter of a fictional representation of Billy Gibbons from ZZ Top (played by the musician himself).  Angela was born in Baltimore, Maryland on April 16, she is half-Chinese, and she once mentioned having taken French in school, in "The Body in the Bag", in season 6.  Her middle name is meant to be an allusion to her father's guitar "Miss Pearly Gates". According to Angela, in "Mother and Child in the Bay", in season 2, Angela is 5'8 and weighs 135 pounds. In Season 10, Angela's real name is discovered to be Pookie Noodlin. Prior to the revelation, it was well known that she was so embarrassed by her birth name that she never told anyone, even her husband and closest friends.

Angela is a specialist in forensic facial reconstruction at the fictional Jeffersonian Institution, who frequently works with Dr. Temperance Brennan, her best friend. Angela received her undergraduate degree at the University of Texas at Austin in Visual Arts, with a minor in computer science. She also studied biomedical illustration at American University. She uses her skills as an artist to develop, maintain, and improve the lab's three-dimensional graphics and computer simulation systems.  She is credited with the innovation of the "Angelator", which is later superseded by the  "Angelatron". In "The Brain in the Bot", in season 12, Angela wins a MacArthur Foundation "genius grant" for which she was nominated by Dr. Temperance Brennan for her "groundbreaking" work with the "Angelatron".

Characterization
Throughout the series, Angela Montenegro is described as a "free spirit", "good-time girl" and "wild child". She is shown to be more socially "normal" than her coworkers at the Jeffersonian, and seems to not consider herself a scientist like the other "squints", instead on multiple occasions referencing facial reconstruction as an "art". In one episode, the character Jack Hodgins calls Angela "the heart of the operation." Angela's more typical social skills are often used by the writers as a balancing point and audience surrogate; she demonstrates a need to interact with other people in a way her more awkward colleagues do not.  Plotlines have alluded that Angela has extensive romantic experience, once telling Zack Addy to "reap the benefits of my sexual wisdom." She also told Brennan, "I don't know how to talk to crazy people unless I'm dating them." When Brennan and Booth become a couple, she is often the one to explain his behavior to Brennan and gives her advice on how to get along with him.

Angela contemplates leaving the Jeffersonian at one point, under the assumption that her work does not contribute to cases in a meaningful way.  She was also unsure of her ability to handle the graphic violence she was exposed to regularly at the lab.  However, Dr. Goodman, the director of the Jeffersonian, spoke of the vital importance of her work in adding an element of humanity to the victims, returning their identity.  This line of reasoning persuades her to remain at the lab.

Romantic relationships

Jack Hodgins
Angela and Hodgins met when Angela was brought on to work at the Jeffersonian by Brennan. While initially on good terms, they grew closer throughout season one. At the beginning of season two, Hodgins became obviously interested in her, and pursued her more openly. After a few episodes of palpable sexual tension, Hodgins finally asked Angela on a date in the episode "The Girl with the Curl". While their date was quite successful, Angela broke it off fearing repercussions if things went badly. Later, after Hodgins was rescued from being buried alive, they kissed, and at the end of the episode they went home together. Angela later asked Hodgins if she could sleep at his place one night after being spooked by restored video footage, and soon they were openly involved. After refusing Hodgins' marriage proposal twice, she proposed to him.  Their wedding was cut short in the season two finale when it was revealed that Angela was technically married to a man from Fiji, Grayson Barasa. Their relationship ended after a lengthy search for her husband, and issues regarding Jack's trust of Angela.

Throughout seasons four and five, the two struggled with their relationship, eventually appearing to form a close, albeit awkward, friendship. After Hodgins declared he would support her during a pregnancy scare while she was dating Wendell Bray, their romantic tension was rekindled.  While collecting evidence together for a murder investigation in Maryland, they were pulled over for a moving violation and subsequently jailed for a variety of minor infractions by a local sheriff. Their time spent together led them to re-examine their relationship, and why they broke up.  When a judge arrived to post their bail, they were finally married in a civil ceremony with the sheriff as witness.  They announced their marriage to their colleagues soon after. At the end of season five, they were planning to spend a year in Paris while Brennan and Booth were away, as neither of them wanted "to break in a new forensic anthropologist and FBI liaison."

Upon their return from Paris, Angela discovers that they are expecting their first child. Angela tries to keep her pregnancy a secret from the Jeffersonian team. This is because Angela wants to wait until after the first trimester and Hodgins wants to reveal the pregnancy when the time is right. It is later revealed that if Angela and Hodgins had a daughter, they would name her Temperance, after Dr. Brennan; but strictly as a middle name, because the name Temperance is "awful". Angela's father wanted to name their child "Staccato Mamba" (this came to him in a dream). However, the three of them finally agree on the names Katherine Temperance for a girl and Michael Joseph for a boy.
In the episode "The Blackout in the Blizzard" Angela and Hodgins find out they are both carriers of Leber's congenital amaurosis, giving their baby a 25 percent chance of blindness. This was a huge devastation for the couple, but in the end they reminded each other that they can handle anything together. Their son was born healthy and without a vision impairment. He was named Michael, as planned, Staccato, as Angela's father wanted, and Vincent, after the late Vincent Nigel-Murray, the full name thus becoming Michael Staccato Vincent Hodgins, but is more commonly known as Michael Vincent.

Grayson Barasa
It is revealed that, at one point, she married in a kava-influenced ceremony in Fiji. She was unsure whether the marriage was legal and had no knowledge of where her husband was after the ritual; in fact, the United States government considered the marriage valid, and prevented her marriage to Hodgins.  When a private investigator tracked down Barasa, he attempted to convince Angela to stay with him, informing her that he had built them a house. Although she had no interest in pursuing anything with him, Barasa's presence eventually precipitated the end of Angela's engagement to Hodgins, because Angela felt that Hodgins did not trust her.

Kirk Persinger
Season 1 Episode 17, "The Skull in the Desert", reveals that, for "three weeks out of the year, Angela has a boyfriend and a vacation." Angela's first revealed steady boyfriend, Kirk, is a "pseudo-famous photographer" who lives in the desert of New Mexico.  Their five-year relationship ends abruptly when Kirk goes off into the desert with his Indigenous guide and never returns.  Angela is prompted to call Temperance for help when a skull is left on the porch of the local sheriff.  Dr. Brennan is able to identify that the skull does belong to Kirk and the premise of the episode is discovering what happened to him out in the desert. According to Angela, he was the guy to whom she compared all other guys.

Roxie Lyon
After breaking off her engagement with Hodgins, Angela resumes a relationship first forged at UT Austin with Roxie, a woman who currently works as a sculptor and who was, at the time of their reconnection, the suspect in a case.  Roxie broke it off with Angela over irreconcilable differences in world view; Angela "lives in the moment" and Roxie wants a partner who plans for the future.

Wendell Bray
After Brennan's intern, Wendell Bray, gives Angela $45 to help save a baby pig, the two kiss and begin a relationship.  Their relationship continued throughout part of Season 5.  After they had been dating for a few months, Angela took a pregnancy test which came up positive. This test is later revealed, by a second test that Dr. Saroyan had run, to be a false positive. When Wendell found out, he told her that he would have supported her in her choices because it was his duty. This caused Angela to realize that while Wendell is a good guy, he was not "[her] guy" and subsequently ended their relationship.  The break-up was mutual and amicable.

References 

Bones (TV series) characters
American female characters in television
Fictional artists
Fictional bisexual females
Television characters introduced in 2005
Fictional characters from Baltimore
Fictional LGBT characters in television